Affirmation Scotland was a network within the Church of Scotland seeking full inclusion of the LGBT communities within the Church. It was founded in 2006, during the debate as to whether ministers should be allowed to conduct civil partnership ceremonies. The activities of Affirmation Scotland were coordinated by The Revd. Blair Robertson.  At the annual General Assembly Service of Affirmation Scotland in May 2016 Affirmation Scotland was wound up.  It exists as a Facebook page where people can post news of interest to LGBTI people, and their friends, connected to The Church of Scotland.

Background
Affirmation Scotland calls for a Church characterised by grace, compassion and inclusion.  While specifically seeking the affirmation and dignity of lesbian and gay Christians within the church, it also seeks a progressive Church in a wider theological sphere, inspired by the Spirit of God, that is semper reformanda – always reforming, always in accordance with a critical understanding of the Word of God.

One of its most prominent supporters has been Professor George Newlands of Glasgow University, Emeritus professor of Divinity.

Services
Affirmation Scotland offers a ministry of care, hope and advocacy to lesbian, gay, bisexual and transgender (lgbt) Christians, their families and supporters. It also seeks to contribute to the debate within the Kirk on human sexuality from a progressive perspective.  The network provided pastoral care to a number of LGBT people, delivered workshops for Kirk Sessions and other church groups and held a Retreat-style conference for a number of years.

Affirmation Scotland sought to:

 create safe places and times for gay people and their friends to meet for worship, fellowship, and support.
 organise events that promote an inclusive church.
 provide resources to the Kirk and the LGBT community promoting the belief that God welcomes into God's family all people regardless of gender, gender identity, or sexual orientation.
 speak out for the dignity and place of gay Christians whenever this is under attack.
 respond appropriately to approaches by the media for comment on issues related to the Kirk.
 be a presence – reminding the Kirk in a consistent way that the lgbt community has always been and is present within the Kirk.

References

External links
 Affirmation Scotland Homepage, retrieved October 22, 2006.

Church of Scotland
LGBT and Protestantism